Kristiina Tullus (born 12 September 1998) is an Estonian footballer who plays as a defender for Flora and the Estonia women's national team.

Career
She made her debut for the Estonia national team on 18 June 2019 against Belarus, starting the match.

References

1998 births
Living people
Women's association football defenders
Estonian women's footballers
Estonia women's international footballers
Footballers from Tallinn
FC Flora (women) players